Hulkamania: Let The Battle Begin Tour was a 2009 professional wrestling tour promoted by Hulk Hogan and Eric Bischoff, which took place in Australia. These events featured the first wrestling appearance of Hogan in Australia. The event was taped by ONE HD.

Background

Shows took place on 21, 24, 26 and  28 November  2009. The main event of each show was between Hulk Hogan and Ric Flair. Flair, performing as a heel, came out of retirement for this. Other wrestlers featured included Spartan-3000, Heidenreich, Eugene, Brutus "The Barber" Beefcake and Orlando Jordan.  Hogan won all four main events in the tour. 

On 21 November Lacey Von Erich won a bikini contest, which also included Koa Marie Turner, Stephanie Pietz and Kiara Dillon. She also interfered in the main event between Hogan and Ric Flair, on Flair's behalf. In other matches on the tour she was used as Flair's manager.

There was talk of another tour in China and other parts of Asia, however after the unsuccessful Australian tour, those plans fell through.
The tour featured Umaga's last match, as he died on 4 December 2009.

Results

Night 1 Melbourne

Night 2 Perth

Night 3 Brisbane

Night 4 Sydney

See also

 Professional wrestling in Australia
 List of professional wrestling organisations in Australia

References

External links
 

Professional wrestling shows
2009 in professional wrestling
Professional wrestling in Australia
Hulk Hogan